Epicnephasia is a genus of moths belonging to the subfamily Tortricinae of the family Tortricidae.

Species
Epicnephasia mongolica Danilevsky, 1963

See also
List of Tortricidae genera

References

External links
tortricidae.com

Tortricidae genera